The 1933 Bowling Green Falcons football team was an American football team that represented Bowling Green State College (later renamed Bowling Green State University) during the 1933 college football season. In their first season as a member of the Ohio Athletic Conference (OAC) and their tenth season under head coach Warren Steller, the Falcons compiled a 2–3–2 record (1–3–2 against OAC opponents), finished in 16th place out of 21 teams in the OAC, and were outscored by a total of 91 to 44. Henry Fearnside was the team captain.

Schedule

References

Bowling Green
Bowling Green Falcons football seasons
Bowling Green Falcons football